The Story of Appleby Capple is a complex children's alphabet book by Anne Parrish in which alliterative narrative, with each chapter focusing on a different letter, is used to tell a story. Appleby Capple is a five-year-old on his way to Cousin Clement's 99th birthday party; he has a number of adventures looking for the perfect present: a Zebra butterfly. The text is accompanied by many cartoon-like illustrations by the author.  The book was first published in 1950 and was a Newbery Honor recipient in 1951.

References

1950 children's books
Alphabet books
American picture books
Newbery Honor-winning works
Harper & Brothers books